Enrique Fernández de Heredia Gaztáñaga was a military commander in the Spanish Civil War fighting on the Republican side. He was a commander of artillery in the Spanish Republican Army before the war and was promoted to command the 31st Division.  He later commanded the XVIII Corps at Brunete and Teruel.

Notes

Year of birth missing
Year of death missing
Spanish army officers
Spanish military personnel of the Spanish Civil War (Republican faction)